Oskar Kanehl (5 October 1888, Berlin – 28 May 1929, Berlin) was a German poet and communist activist.

Kanehl studied literature and philosophy at the University of Würzburg and University of Greifswald before moving to the village of Weick in 1912. From 1913 he published Die Wiecker Boten (The Weicker Messenger) a left-wing literary-political monthly. He also contributed to Franz Pfemfert's Die Aktion. The Wiecker Bote was banned with the outbreak of the war, and Kanehl moved to Berlin where he continued his anti-militarist activism.

He committed suicide by jumping from his window on 28 May 1929. Erich Mühsam and Franz Pfemfert spoke at his funeral.

External links
Selected Poems by Oscar Kanehl

References
3. Oskar Kanehl: "Kein Mensch hat das Recht, für Ruhe und Ordnung zu sorgen", complete work and biography, edited by Wolfgang Haug, 400p., Edition AV, Lich 2016

1888 births
1929 suicides
20th-century German poets
German male poets
20th-century German male writers
University of Würzburg alumni
University of Greifswald alumni
Suicides by jumping in Germany
Writers from Berlin